Yonatan Fridman (born March 14, 2003) is an Israeli acrobatic gymnast who won a silver medal at the 2018 Youth Olympic Games.

He was born in Israel.
Fridman is 181 cm tall (5' 11").

Gymnastics career
His acrobatic gymnastics coach is Shiran Ouaknine.

Fridman won the silver medal for mixed pair acrobatic gymnastics, at the 2018 Youth Olympic Games which took place at Buenos Aires, Argentina, along with his partner Noa Kazado Yakar. They achieved a score of 27.590 (losing by 0.260 points to the team from Bulgaria). They dedicated their performance to the late boyfriend of their coach, who had died in a motorcycle accident.

See also
Israel at the Youth Olympics

References 

Israeli acrobatic gymnasts

Living people
Gymnasts at the 2018 Summer Youth Olympics

2003 births